A big city is a metropolis. 

The proper name Big City may refer to:

Music
 Big City (Merle Haggard album), a 1981 album by Merle Haggard
 "Big City" (Merle Haggard song), the title track and a No. 1 country hit from the above album
 Big City (Billy Crawford album), a 2005 album from Filipino singer Billy Crawford
 "Big City" (Spacemen 3 song), a single by the English alternative rock band Spacemen 3
 "Big City", a song by Dutch singer Tol Hansse about the Dutch city Amsterdam

Movies
The Big City (1928 film), directed by Tod Browning
Big City (1937 film), directed by Frank Borzage, starring Luise Rainer and Spencer Tracy
Big City (1948 film), directed by Norman Taurog
The Big City (1963 film), directed by Satyajit Ray

Places
 Big City (comics), a fictional future city in Antarctica
 New York City, often colloquially referred to as the Big City
 London, often referred to as the Big City

Other
Matt Adams, baseball player nicknamed "Big City"
Big City (shopping mall), a shopping mall in Hsinchu, Taiwan

See also
 World's largest cities